Southern Gateway is a census-designated place in Stafford County, Virginia. The population as of the 2010 Census was 2,805. The "Southern Gateway" is described by the county as the area adjoining U.S. Route 17 between Interstate 95 and Berea Road to the west.

References

Census-designated places in Stafford County, Virginia
Census-designated places in Virginia